Anne Aghion (born 1960) is a French-American documentary filmmaker. She is a Guggenheim Fellow, a Mac Dowell Colony Fellow and a Rockefeller Foundation Bellagio Center Fellow.

In 2005, she won an Emmy Award for her documentary In Rwanda We Say…The Family That Does Not Speak Dies. In 2009, her film "My Neighbor My Killer" was Official Selection of the Cannes Film Festival and a nominee for Best Documentary at the Gotham Awards.

Filmmaking career
Aghion is best known for her documentary films on post-genocide Rwanda. Her feature film My Neighbor My Killer, an official selection at the Cannes Film Festival in 2009, poses the question of "How do you make it right again?" after the end of the genocide. This film as well as the three installments of the Gacaca trilogy are the result of nearly ten years of footage gathered in a small rural community in Rwanda.

In Aghion's first Rwanda film Gacaca, Living Together Again In Rwanda?, the first installment of the Gacaca series, Anne Aghion closely examines the Gacaca courts, a citizen-based justice system that aims to try the crimes of the genocide. The proceedings would occur on grass – "Gacaca" in Kinyarwanda – where anyone who had a denouncement against the accused would be free to speak. If no one accused a prisoner, then that prisoner would be freed.

In Rwanda We Say…The Family That Does Not Speak Dies, the second film of the trilogy, chronicles the release of a suspect in his community and how victims and suspects slowly learn how to live together.

The third installment of her Rwanda series The Notebooks of Memory was released in 2009 and gives an account of the beginning of the Gacaca trials. It focuses on the local citizen-judges' examination of testimonies from both the survivors and those accused of the crimes.
The Gacaca films have won numerous awards and gained international fame. They have also been widely used by non-profit organizations for educational and training purposes, and have been screened to officials, victims and prisoners in Rwanda.

On a grant of the National Science Foundation Antarctic artist and writer program, Aghion peregrinated to Antarctica, where she filmed the feature-length, Ice People,. In Ice People, she filmed the lives of geologists and North Dakota State University professors Allan Ashworth and Adam Lewis and the McMurdo Station staff over four months. The scientists, accompanied by two undergraduate students, researched fossils of ancient specimens as they sought to uncover the climatic evolution of the world's coldest continent. The film premiered at the San Francisco International Film Festival in April 2008 and was shown at the Independence Night Film of the Film Society of Lincoln Center in 2008.

Her first film, Se Le Movió El Piso (The Earth Moved Under Him)—A Portrait of Managua, was shot in the skid row of Managua. The film gives viewers an inside look in the life of Nicaraguan slum dwellers as they recount the numerous obstacles they have had to overcome in their lives.

Aghion is a member of Film Fatales women's independent filmmaker collective.

Biography and early career
Aghion splits her time between residences in New York City and Paris.

Before becoming a filmmaker, Aghion held various posts at The New York Times Paris bureau and the International Herald Tribune. Prior to her debut as director and producer of her own films, she worked as a videographer, as well as production and post-production manager.

Aghion earned a Bachelor of Arts Magna Cum Laude in Arab Language and Literature from Barnard College at Columbia University in New York, and following her studies, lived in Cairo, Egypt, for two years.

Awards
Aghion won an Emmy Award in 2005 for her documentary In Rwanda We Say…The Family That Does Not Speak Dies. My Neighbor My Killer was an Official Selection of the Cannes Film Festival in 2009, nominated for Best Documentary at the Gotham Awards. It was screened at the 2009 Human Rights Watch International Film Festival at the Lincoln Center for the Performing Arts in New York where Aghion received the Néstor Almendros Award (named for the Oscar-winning Néstor Almendros) for courage in filmmaking. It also was Best Documentary at the Montreal Black Festival. Aghion also won a UNESCO Fellini Prize for Gacaca, Living Together Again In Rwanda?

Ice People screened at the San Francisco Film Festival in 2008 and at the Independence Film Night of the Film Society of Lincoln Center.

In 1996, her first documentary Se le movió el piso: A portrait of Managua won the Coral Award for "Best Non-Latin American Documentary on Latin America" at the Havana Film Festival in Havana, Cuba.

Aghion is also a recipient of the prestigious Guggenheim Fellowship, the Mac Dowell Colony Fellowship and the Rockefeller foundation's Bellagio Center Fellowship. She has received significant praise for her work, which has been seen all over the world and is part of the collection of a great number of international university libraries.

Filmography
 Se le movió el piso: A portrait of Managua (1995)
 Gacaca, Living Together Again In Rwanda? (2002)
 In Rwanda We Say…The Family That Does Not Speak Dies (2004)
 Ice People (2008)
 The Notebooks of Memory (2009)
 My Neighbor, My Killer (2009)

References

External links
 Official website
 Official Gacaca Films website
 Official Ice People website
 
 
 Anne Aghion at VH1
 Biography of Anne Aghion at The Women's College Coalition

1960 births
Living people
American documentary filmmakers
French documentary filmmakers
Emmy Award winners
Barnard College alumni
Film directors from Paris
The New York Times writers
The New York Times corporate staff
Date of birth missing (living people)
French emigrants to the United States
French documentary film producers